Gwynne Road is a road located in Lucknow, Uttar Pradesh in India, that travels through Aminabad and Maulviganj.
It is famous for its paper market.

References

Roads in Lucknow